The discography of Blutengel, a German darkwave band, consists of eleven studio albums, two compilation albums, twenty one singles, five extended plays, and many compilation and remixes.

Albums

Studio albums

Compilations

Live albums/DVDs

Mini albums and EPs

Singles / Maxi-CDs

Music videos

Other releases

Exclusive tracks appearing on compilations 
 1998: Awake the Machines Vol.2 – Love
 2000: Machineries of Joy – Fairyland (Female Version)
 2001: Orkus Collection 2 – Hold Me (Just For This Night)
 2002: Fear Section Vol.1 – Weg Zu Mir (Shicksals-Version 2002)
 2002: Machineries of Joy Vol.2 – Waiting For You
 2003: Machineries of Joy Vol.3 – Falling
 2006: Machineries of Joy Vol.4 – Misery
 2008: Awake The Machines Vol.6 - Born Again
 2010: Electrostorm Vol.2 - Soultaker
 2011: Awake The Machines Vol.7 - Death is Calling (Exclusive ATM Remix)
 2012: Machineries of Joy Vol.5 - A Place Called Home
 2012: Electrostorm Vol.3 - Anders Sein
 2013: Electrostorm Vol.4 - When I Feel You
 2014: Electrostorm Vol.5 - Krieger
 2015: Electrostorm Vol.6 - Not Me (Leave In Silence)
 2016: Electrostorm Vol.7 - Soul Of Ice (ReWorked)
 2017: Electrostorm Vol.8 - Gott:Glaube

References

Electronic music group discographies